Fildeh (also Romanized as Fīldeh; also known as Falīdah, Falīdeh, Felīd, Felīdeh, and Fil’dy) is a village in Rostamabad-e Jonubi Rural District, in the Central District of Rudbar County, Gilan Province, Iran. At the 2006 census, its population was 20, in 5 families.

References 

Populated places in Rudbar County